Atrophaneura aidoneus, the lesser batwing, is an Asian species of butterfly that belongs to the batwings group of Atrophaneura, comprising tailless black swallowtail butterflies.

Description
 Wingspan: 112–162 mm.
 Male: Tailless. Above, the butterfly is bluish black and unmarked. It has a white scent patch in a square dorsal fold, which is pink or red on its marginal edge. This white scent patch is smaller than that of the common windmill.
 Female: Tailless. Above, the butterfly is grey brown. It has dark stripes between the veins.

Resembles Atrophaneura varuna race astorion, but differs as follows: Cell of forewing proportionately not quite so long; abdominal fold to the hindwing in male not so broad, its lower margin not square, rounded; the specialized scales within the fold white, with an edging of pink. Female larger. Upperside: ground colour olivaceous brown, never black; abdomen with a broad white, not crimson, lateral stripe.

Range
Northern India, Bhutan, Burma, northern Vietnam, northern Laos, southern China (including Hainan (Guangdong province)).

In India, it is found in Uttarakhand, Sikkim, Assam, Meghalaya, Manipur and Nagaland.

Status
The butterfly is not common but not regarded as threatened.

Taxonomy
No subspecies.

Habitat

Habits
The lesser batwing is a shade-loving forest butterfly. It has a slow and graceful flight. Both sexes frequent flowers, often Lantana.

See also
Swallowtail butterfly
List of butterflies of India
List of butterflies of India (Papilionidae)

Cited references

References

External links
 Image of reliably identified specimen

Atrophaneura
Butterflies of Asia
Butterflies described in 1845